The Founders' Award is presented by the Yorkton Film Festival.

History
In 1947 the Yorkton Film Council was founded.  In 1950 the first Yorkton Film Festival was held in Yorkton, Saskatchewan, Canada.  During the first few festivals, the films were adjudicated by audience participation through ballot casting and winners were awarded Certificates of Merit by the film festival council.  In 1958 the film council established the Yorkton Film Festival Golden Sheaf Award for the category Best of Festival, awarded to the best overall film of the festival.  Over the years various additional categories were added to the competition.  As of 2020, the Golden Sheaf Award categories included: Main Entry Categories, Accompanying Categories, Craft Categories, and Special Awards.

In 2007 The Founders' Award was added to the film festival Special Awards competition. The winner of this award is determined by a panel of jurors chosen by the film council. This cash prize and plaque is presented to the winner "in memory of the founding members of the Yorkton festival" for the most "outstanding production exemplifying historical Canadian characters or events."

Winners

2000s

2010s

References 

Awards established in 2007
Yorkton Film Festival awards